"Is There Something I Should Know?" is the eighth single by British pop band Duran Duran, released on 14 March 1983. 

The song was released as a stand-alone single and became the band's first UK number one record.  It debuted in the number one position on the UK Singles Chart on 26 March 1983. The single also had great success in America, where it was released in late May. The song reached number four on the US Billboard Hot 100 on 6 August 1983 and sold more than a million copies.

Background
"Is There Something I Should Know?" was recorded at Tony Visconti’s Good Earth Studios in Soho, London with producer Ian Little, who was recommended to the group by Roxy Music’s Phil Manzanera. Eventually, the song would undergo several rounds of mixing due to a lack of compression on the drums as Little asserted: one mix was done at Good Earth, one at Eel Pie Studios, one at The Gallery and one at The Power Station in New York with Bob Clearmountain. Keyboardist Nick Rhodes remembered being present most of the night during the mix with Clearmountain and leaving the next day thinking the band had something special on their hands. But upon reflection some days later, it was decided that despite being what they considered a "beautiful mix", it was a little too soft for the sound they were trying to achieve for the record. So the final mix would be done with producer Alex Sadkin (who’d be brought in to produce the band’s next album alongside Little, Seven  and the Ragged Tiger) and Phil Thornalley at RAK Studios, London, who replaced the drums with samples triggered via AMS delay units.

Although generally regarded as a stand-alone single, it was added to the 1983 US re-issue of the band's 1981 debut album, Duran Duran. The first album on which the song featured in the UK was the inaugural Now That's What I Call Music compilation at the end of the year.

The singles from the Duran Duran album did not receive much airplay in the United States on the album's first release; both the band and the New Romantic fashion style were unknown, and very few British bands were able to break into American radio at that time. However, by the end of 1982, the band's Rio album was rapidly climbing the American charts, fueled by saturation airplay of various Duran Duran videos on MTV. The band and their label, Capitol/EMI, decided to re-release the debut album in the United States with the inclusion of this newly recorded single.

Because of the time limitations of vinyl records, the inclusion of "Is There Something I Should Know?" required the omission of the album track "To The Shore" on the reissue. "To The Shore" was reinstated on later compact disc pressings.

"Is There Something I Should Know?" was the opening song on Duran Duran’s set list for the 1983/84 Seven and the Ragged Tiger tour - as well as Duran Duran's charity concert at Aston Villa football ground in 1983.

In its contemporary review of the song, Cash Box praised "the upbeat arrangement, clear production and lustrous vocals." David Hepworth of Smash Hits just noticed that producer change lead to "more pronounced rock group sound" and expressed displeasure with impossibility to do something "with an overly-strained chorus." In a retrospective review of the song, Allmusic journalist Donald A. Guarisco wrote that the lyrics "deal with a difficult romantic relationship in rather obtuse terms." Guarisco highlighted what he described as "odd turns of phrase" in the lyrics, such as: "and fiery demons all dance when you walk through that door/Don't say you're easy on me 'cause you're about as easy as a nuclear war."

Although Guarisco questioned the lyrics, he praised the melody in the song. He wrote: "The melody of 'Is There Something I Should Know?' is one of Duran Duran's catchiest, matching twisty verse melodies full of ear-catching hooks with a harmonized chorus."

According to Rhodes, the pulsing keyboard sound is from a Roland Jupiter-8 synth, while the Prophet-5 was used for a small melodic part.

Music video
The video for "Is There Something I Should Know?" featured colour clips of the band members, in blue shirts with tucked-in white ties, interspersed with surreal images in black-and-white. The video made a point of marking the transition between albums one and two - and the third, featuring clips from several earlier Duran Duran videos.  This included "My Own Way" - presented on the Duran Duran Video Album but never released to MTV.

The video was directed by Russell Mulcahy, and was one of the most popular videos of 1983 on MTV. The video is longer as there are verses that were edited out of the original 45 release, that subsequently made it to album, tape and CD. The DVD Greatest Hits has the long version video

When asked if there was anything about their videos they'd like to change, drummer Roger Taylor commented, "The only part of a video I would change is the end of 'Is There Something I Should Know?' where I am singing to the camera. I look very uncomfortable doing this and cringe every time I see it to this day."

B-sides, bonus tracks and remixes
The B-side to "Is There Something I Should Know?" in the UK is the instrumental "Faith in This Colour".  An "Alternate Slow Mix" of "Faith in this Colour" was used on the 7" single, some pressings of which included brief unauthorized sound samples from the movie Star Wars—these were promptly withdrawn when copyright concerns were raised, although on the "Alternate Slow Mix" from the singles box set, the scene, in which Obi-Wan leaves to disable the tractor beam, can clearly be heard in the last minute. Duran Duran has not confirmed this, though.

The mainly instrumental "Monster Mix" of "Is There Something I Should Know?" was completed by producers Ian Little and Alex Sadkin and Phil Thornalley at RAK studio One.

In the US, the song "Careless Memories" is the B-side of "Is There Something I Should Know?".

Formats and track listing

7": EMI. / EMI 5371 United Kingdom
 "Is There Something I Should Know?" – 4:11
 "Faith in This Colour (Alternate Slow Mix)" – 4:06

12": EMI. / 12 EMI 5371 United Kingdom
 "Is There Something I Should Know?" (Monster Mix) – 6:43
 "Faith in This Colour" – 4:06

7": Capitol Records. / B-5233 United States 
 "Is There Something I Should Know?" – 4:07
 "Careless Memories" – 3:53
 Track 2 is the "Album Version".

12": Capitol Records. / 8551 United States 
 "Is There Something I Should Know?" (Monster Mix) – 6:40
 "Faith in This Colour" – 4:05

12": EMI. / EMI Electrola 1C K062-65-106Z Germany 
 "Is There Something I Should Know?" (Monster Mix) – 6:43
 "Is There Something I Should Know?" (Short Mix) – 4:06
 "Faith in This Colour" – 4:04
 Track 2 "Short Mix" is the "Single Version".

CD: Part of "Singles Box Set 1981–1985" boxset
 "Is There Something I Should Know?" – 4:11
 "Faith in This Colour" – 4:05
 "Is There Something I Should Know?" (Monster Mix) – 6:40
 "Faith in This Colour (Alternate Slow Mix)" – 4:05
"Monster Mix" remixed by Alex Sadkin, Ian Little and Phil Thornalley.

Covers, samples and media references

The band Sugar Ray took elements from the video and featured them in a segment of the music video for their single "When It's Over".

Cover versions of the song have been recorded by The Mr. T Experience, Harvey Danger and allSTARS*, the last of which took the song back into the UK charts at #12 in September 2001 as a double-A-side with their own track "Things That Go Bump In The Night".

The second episode of the sixth season of the cartoon series The Venture Bros., entitled "Maybe No Go", follows Billy Quizboy and Pete White retrieving the rubber ball prop used in the music video from their archenemy, a collector of pop culture memorabillia.

The line "you're about as easy as a nuclear war" was the inspiration for the Duran Duran song "Yo Bad Azizi", included as a B-side to the "Serious" single released seven years later.

allSTARS* version 

Track Listing

CD
 "Things That Go Bump In The Night"
 "Is There Something I Should Know"
 "Is There Something I Should Know" (Almighty Mix)
 "Things That Go Bump In The Night" (Video)

Cassette
 "Things That Go Bump In The Night"
 "Is There Something I Should Know"
 "That Crazy Thing That We Call Love"

12" Vinyl
 "Is There Something I Should Know" (Mothership Mix)
 "Is There Something I Should Know" (Almighty Mix)
 "Is There Something I Should Know" (K Boys Club Mix)
 "Is There Something I Should Know" (Radio Edit)
 "Things That Go Bump In The Night" (Xenomania Mix)
 "Things That Go Bump In The Night" (Radio Edit)

Promo CD
 "Things That Go Bump In The Night" (Radio Edit)
 "Is There Something I Should Know" (Radio Edit)

Charts

Weekly charts

Year-end charts

As of October 2021 "Is There Something I Should Know?" is the eleventh most streamed Duran Duran song in the UK.

Other appearances
Apart from the single, "Is There Something I Should Know?" has also appeared on:

Albums:
Duran Duran (1983 US Re-release)
Arena (1984 live album)
Tiger! Tiger! EP (Japan only, 1984)
Decade (1989)
Night Versions: The Essential Duran Duran (US only, 1998)
Greatest (1998)
Strange Behaviour (1999)
Singles Box Set 1981–1985 (2003)
Singles Box Set 1986–1995 (2004)
Seven and the Ragged Tiger (2010 remastered version)

Singles:
Capitol Gold Cuts (1990)
Come Undone (1993)

Personnel
Duran Duran are:
Simon Le Bon – vocals, harmonica 
Nick Rhodes – keyboards
John Taylor – bass guitar
Roger Taylor – drums
Andy Taylor – guitar, vocals

Also credited:
Ian Little – producer
Alex Sadkin – mixer
Phil Thornalley – mix engineer 
Mike Nocito – mix assistant engineer
RAK studios – mix studio

References

1983 singles
Duran Duran songs
UK Singles Chart number-one singles
Music videos directed by Russell Mulcahy
Allstars (band) songs
Songs written by Simon Le Bon
Songs written by John Taylor (bass guitarist)
Songs written by Roger Taylor (Duran Duran drummer)
Songs written by Andy Taylor (guitarist)
Songs written by Nick Rhodes
Capitol Records singles
EMI Records singles